D.C. Stover (May 9, 1839 – January 17, 1908) was a 19th-century industrialist who was known for founding the Stover Wind Engine Company, the Stover Manufacturing and Engine Company, the Stover Bicycle Manufacturing Company and the Stover Engine Works. He was considered to be one of the wealthiest man in Freeport Illinois.

Early life

He was born in Antrim Township, Pennsylvania May 9, 1839. He was the son of Jacob P. Stover and Elizabeth (née) Emmert Stover. He was the youngest of 12 children and he lived on the family farm in Pennsylvania until he was 18. He moved to California for a time and he worked as a miner. In 1866 he moved to Freeport Illinois. It was then that he worked on inventing farming items, and he invented machines for the manufacture of barbed wire fences. On the 1880 U.S. Census form he listed his occupation as "inventor".

Career 

Throughout his career he set up many businesses. In 1876 D.C. Stover set up the Stover Wind Engine Company to sell Windmills.

In 1881 Stover started a farming machine manufacturing company which he called the Stover Manufacturing and Engine Company.

In 1889 Stover founded the Stover Bicycle Manufacturing Company to produce bicycles, they started with just 6 employees. The company produced bicycles under the name Phoenix. They were one of the early manufacturers of the Safety bicycle.

By 1897, his bicycle company had become one of the largest bicycle producers: making 20,000 bicycles per year. By 1899 he had sold the company to a Bicycle Trust which organized under the name American Bicycle Company.

Stover then started several other companies in Freeport Illinois. He manufactured combustion engines under the name Stover engine Works. He also operated the Stover Motor Car Company for the manufacture of automobiles and marine motors.

During Stover's career his companies produced, tanks, bicycles, stationary engines, windmills, cultivators, and other farm equipment.

Personal life 
July 13, 1871 he married Mary C. (née) Porter. They had a son and a daughter. He made two trips around the world before his death.

Death 
Stover's cause of death was reported as a severe heart ailment.

Notes

References

External links 
Daniel Carl Stover at Find a Grave

1858 births
1916 deaths
Businesspeople from Illinois
19th-century American businesspeople
19th-century industrialists
20th-century industrialists
20th-century American businesspeople